Kristian Dacey (born 25 July 1989) is a Welsh rugby union player. A hooker, he plays club rugby for the Cardiff Rugby having started his rugby playing with Merthyr RFC before honing his skills at Pontypridd RFC.
That chant "Dacey, score a try. Dacey, Dacey, score a try" can often be heard from the terraces at the Cardiff Arms Park in recognition of the hookers excellent strike rate.

On 20 January 2015, Dacey was named in the 34-man Wales squad for the 2015 Six Nations Championship.

Dacey made his full international debut for Wales versus Ireland on 8 August 2015 as a second-half replacement.

Dacey was called up as cover for the 2017 British & Irish Lions tour to New Zealand.

References

External links 

 Cardiff Blues profile

Welsh rugby union players
Wales international rugby union players
Cardiff Rugby players
1989 births
Living people
Rugby union players from Merthyr Tydfil
Merthyr RFC players
People educated at Bishop Hedley High School
Rugby union hookers